Women's Health Issues is a bimonthly peer-reviewed medical journal covering women's health care and policy. It is the official journal of the Jacobs Institute of Women's Health and published on their behalf by Elsevier. The editor-in-chief is Chloe E. Bird (RAND Corporation).

Abstracting and indexing 
The journal is abstracted and indexed in:

According to the Journal Citation Reports, the journal has a 2015 impact factor of 1.811, ranking it 4th out of 40 journals in the category "Women's Studies".

See also 
 List of medical journals
 List of women's studies journals

References

External links 
 

Bimonthly journals
Elsevier academic journals
English-language journals
George Washington University
Publications established in 1990
Women's health
Healthcare journals
Academic journals associated with universities and colleges of the United States